Thenmarachchi is one of the three historic regions of the Jaffna peninsula in northern Sri Lanka. The other two regions are Vadamarachchi and Valikamam. Thenmarachchi is sometimes spelt Thenmarachi, Thenmaraachi or Thenmaraadchi. This area, like the entire Jaffna peninsula, is populated mostly by Tamil people and was for many years under the de facto control of the "Tamil Tigers".

Etymology
Thenmarachchi translates to "possession of southerners" or "rule of the southerners" in English. It is derived from the Tamil words thenmar (southerners) and achchi (possession or rule).

Cities and villages in Thenmarachchi
 Varani
 Navatkadu
 Idaikurichchi
 Thavalai, Iyattralai
 Kodikamam 
 Kaithady
 Navatkuli
 Thachchanthoppu
 Sarasalai
 Mattuvil
 Chavakachcheri
 Maravanpulavu
 Arukkuveli
 Nunavil
 Meesalai
 Kachchai
 Mirusuvil
 Ottuveli
 Vidaththalpalai
 Keratheevu
 Kerudavil
 Anthananthidal
 Allarai
 Paalavi
 Ketpeli
 Thanankilapu
 Usan
 Manthuvil
 Kilali
 Eluthumattuval

See also
 Kachchai
 Vadamarachchi
 Valikamam

References

 
Geography of Jaffna District